Lydia Paterson (born October 17, 1996) is an American shooter. She represented her country at the 2016 Summer Olympics in Rio de Janeiro.

References 

1996 births
Living people
American female sport shooters
Shooters at the 2016 Summer Olympics
Olympic shooters of the United States
21st-century American women
20th-century American women